Hans Schröder (28 July 1931 in Saarbrücken – 6 April 2010) was a German sculptor and painter.

Awards
1953 Auszeichnung des Hanauer Goldschmiedehauses
1958 Ehrenpreis der École Française
1982 Albert-Weisgerber-Preis für Bildende Kunst der Stadt St. Ingbert
2001 Saarländischer Verdienstorden

Literature
 Hans Schröder. Plastiken und Graphiken 1970 – 1980. München: Wolf, ca. 1980. 84 S., Abb.
 Hans Schröder. [Ausstellungskat. Moderne Galerie des Saarland-Museums]. Dillingen: Krüger, 1982. 131 S., zahlr. Abb.
 Hans Schröder – Plastiken, Zeichnungen, Fotocollagen u. Gemälde 1950–1988. Freren: Luca Verlag, 1989. 272 S., zahlr. Abb. 
 Hans Schröder [Mit einem Vorwort des Künstlers]. o.O., Verl. u. Jahr. 47 S., zahlr. Farbabb.

References
Obituary

1931 births
2010 deaths
German sculptors
German male sculptors
20th-century German painters
20th-century German male artists
German male painters
21st-century German painters
21st-century German male artists
20th-century sculptors